
Year 792 (DCCXCII) was a leap year starting on Sunday (link will display the full calendar) of the Julian calendar. The denomination 792 for this year has been used since the early medieval period, when the Anno Domini calendar era became the prevalent method in Europe for naming years.

Events 
 By place 
 Byzantine Empire 
 Spring – Emperor Constantine VI suppresses a rebellion, and restores his mother Irene to her former position as co-empress of the Byzantine Empire. The rival factions in Constantinople continue their intrigues against Constantine.
 Battle of Marcellae: Constantine VI leads a Byzantine expeditionary force into northern Thrace. At the border castle of Marcellae, near the modern town of Karnobat (Bulgaria), the Bulgarians under Kardam defeat the Byzantines. 

 Europe 
 The Westphalians rise up against the Saxons, in response to a forcible recruitment for wars against the Avars. However, Pepin, sub-king of Northern Italy and son of King Charlemagne, continues the war, and wins considerable booty from the Avars.
 Charlemagne banishes his oldest (illegitimate) son Pepin the Hunchback to a monastery at Prüm, for a rebellion against him. A group of Frankish nobles plan to kill Charlemagne, but the conspiracy is ultimately discovered.

 Britain 
 September – King Æthelred I of Northumbria marries Princess Ælfflæd, daughter of King Offa of Mercia, at Catterick. Unrest in Northumbria tempts the exiled king Osred II back to his kingdom from the Isle of Man. His supporters desert him, and Osred II is killed by Æthelred's men at Aynburg. He is buried at Tynemouth Priory. 
 Offa arranges coastal defences to fend off Viking attacks. He forms an alliance with Essex, Kent and Sussex, in an attempt to unify England (approximate date).

Births 
 Abd al-Rahman II, Muslim emir of Córdoba (d. 852)
 Abo, Japanese prince (d. 842)
 Adrian II, pope of the Catholic Church (d. 872)
 Bai Minzhong, chancellor of the Tang Dynasty (d. 861)
 Virasena, Indian mathematician (d. 853)

Deaths 
 August 12 – Jænberht, archbishop of Canterbury
 Cináed mac Artgail, king of Connacht (Ireland)
 Máel Ruain, Irish abbot and founder of Tallaght Abbey
 Michael Lachanodrakon, Byzantine general (strategos)
 Osred II, king of Northumbria

References